WSEV may refer to:

WSEV (AM), a radio station (930 AM) licensed to Sevierville, Tennessee, United States
WSEV-FM, a radio station (105.5 FM) licensed to Gatlinburg, Tennessee, United States